The USA Outdoor Track and Field Championships is an annual outdoor competition in the sport of athletics organised by USA Track & Field, which serves as the national championship for the sport in the United States. The venue of the championships is decided on an annual basis and several events are hosted separately.

The earliest national champions were declared by the New York Athletic Club at their annual men's championships, starting in 1876. The National Association of Amateur Athletes of America was formed and organised the men's national championships from 1879 to 1888, followed by the Amateur Athletic Union (AAU) from 1888 to 1979. The AAU held a women's championship for the first time in 1923, which has since been held annually (bar 1934). The men's and women's championships have been held jointly since 1976. Following professionalisation of the sport, the running of the national championships was taken over by The Athletics Congress of the USA (TAC) from 1980. TAC rebranded as USA Track & Field (USATF) in 1993. The national championships served as the United States Olympic Trials (track and field) in 1920, 1928, 1932, and from 1992 onwards. Olympic Trials were held separately in other years, and winners at the trial event were not declared national champions.

The national championships for cross country and road running are held separately from the main track and field competition.

Men

100 metres

200 metres

400 metres

800 metres

1500 metres

5000 metres

10,000 metres

5K run

8K run

10K run

7 miles
2002: Meb Keflezighi

12K run
1987: Dirk Lakeman
1988–92: Not held
1993: Mark Coogan
1994–95: Chris Fox
1996: Mark Coogan

15K run

10 miles

20K run

Half marathon

25K run

30K run

Marathon

50K run
Champions from USATF
1976: Chuck Smead
1977: Allan Kirik
1978: Jack Brennan
1979: John Cederholm
1980: Bill DeVoe
1981: Richard Holloway
1982–83: Charlie Trayer
1984: Mel Williams
198–88: Not held
1989: John Naslund
1990: Barney Klecker
1991–98: Not held
1999: Mike Harrison
2000–01: Not held
2002: Dan Verrington
2003: Not held
2004: Mike Dudley
2005: Not held
2006: Jason Saitta
2007: Greg Crowther
2008–11: Michael Wardian
2012–13: Joseph Gray

50 miles
Champions from USATF
1966: Jim McDonagh
1967: Thomas J. Osler
1968: Ted Corbitt
1969: Not held
1970: Bob Deines
1971: Not held
1972: Ross Smith
1973: Not held
1974: Max White
1975: Jim Pearson
1976: Frank Bozanich
1977: Jim Czachor
1978: Ken Moffitt
1979: Frank Bozanich
1980: Barney Klecker
1981: Frank Bozanich
1982: John Raveling
1983: Hector Rodriguez
1984: Christian Pellerin
1985: Michael Fedak
1986–96: Not held
1997–98: Brian Teason
1999: Mark Goodale
2000–03: Not held
2004: Chad Ricklefs
2005: Andrew McDowell
2006: Not held
2007: Mark Lundblad
2008: Eric Grossman
2009–10: Todd Braje
2011: Michael Wardian
2012: Zach Bitter
2013: Matt Flaherty

100K run
Champions from USATF
1987: Charlie Trayer
1988: Rae Clark
1989: Charlie Trayer
1990: Bill Clements
1991: Sean Crom
1992: Robert Perez
1993: Bryan Hacker
1994–95: Rich Hanna
1996–98: Kevin Setnes
1999: Not held
2000: Howard Nippert
2001: Jim Garcia
2002: Chad Ricklefs
2003: Not held
2004: Tim Clement
2005–06: Not held
2007: Greg Crowther
2008: Michael Wardian
2009: Not held
2010: Matt Woods
2011: Andrew Henshaw
2012: Not held
2013: Nick Accardo
2014: Zach Bitter
2015: Mike Bialick

100 miles
Champions from GBR Athletics
1983: Ray Scannell
1984: Lion Caldwell
1985: Don Jewell
1986: Lion Caldwell
1987: Roy Pirrung
1988: Not held
1989: Rae Clark
1990–2002: Not held
2003: Tim Clement
2004: Bob Sweeney
2005: Steve Peterson

24-hour run
Champions from USATF
1988: Roy Pirrung
1989: Scott Demaree
1990: Rae Clark
1991: Roy Pirrung
1992: Not held
1993: Kevin Setnes
1994: Tommy Taylor
1995: Kurt Madden
1996: John Geesler
1997: David Luljak
1998: Kevin Setnes
1999: Mark Godale
2000: John Geesler
2001: Rudy Afanador
2002: John Geesler
2003: Joseph Gaebler
2004–05: Steve Peterson
2006: Alex Swenson
2007: Bob Sweeney
2008: Byron Lane
2009: Philip McCarthy
2010: Serge Arbona
2011: Philip McCarthy
2012: Jon Olsen

3000 metres steeplechase

110 metres hurdles

200 metres hurdles

400 metres hurdles

High jump

Pole vault

Pole vault for distance
1893: A.H. Green
1906: Martin Sheridan
1907: Martin Sheridan
1908: W.A. McLeod
1909: Harry Babcock
1910: Platt Adams
1911: Harry Babcock
1912: Not held
1913: Platt Adams
1914: Platt Adams
1915: Platt Adams

Long jump

Triple jump

Shot put

Discus throw

Discus throw – Greek style
1907: Martin Sheridan

Hammer throw

Weight throw

Javelin throw

Pentathlon

All-Around

Decathlon

Women

50 metres

100 metres

200 metres

400 metres

800 metres

1500 metres

3000 metres

5000 metres

10,000 metres

5K run

8K run

10K run

7 miles
2002: Colleen De Reuck

12K run
1993: Lynn Jennings
1994: Jody Hawkins
1995: Gwyn Coogan
1996: Anne Marie Letko
1997: Not held
1998: Susannah Beck

3000 metres steeplechase

100 metres hurdles

200 metres hurdles
1965: Jenny Meldrum (CAN)
1966–68: Patty Van Wolvelaere
1969–72: Pat Hawkins

400 metres hurdles

High jump

Pole vault

Long jump

Triple jump

Shot put

Discus throw

Hammer throw

Javelin throw

Baseball throw

Pentathlon and heptathlon

References

Champions 1876–2006
UNITED STATES CHAMPIONSHIPS (MEN 1943-). GBR Athletics. Retrieved 2021-04-30.
UNITED STATES CHAMPIONSHIPS (MEN 1876-1942). GBR Athletics. Retrieved 2021-04-30.
UNITED STATES CHAMPIONSHIPS (WOMEN). GBR Athletics. Retrieved 2021-04-30.

Winners
 List
USA Outdoor Track and Field Championships
Track and field